Jay Lawrence may refer to:

 Jay Lawrence (actor) (1924–1987), American stand-up comedian and actor
 Jay Lawrence (politician), member of the Arizona House of Representatives